Dripping Springs is a city in Hays County, Texas, United States. The population was 4,650 at the 2020 census. Dripping Springs is a primarily rural town.

Geography

Dripping Springs is in northern Hays County at  (30.191998, –98.085382). It is on U.S. Route 290, which leads east  to Austin and west  to Johnson City.

Most of the city drains southwest to Onion Creek, an east-flowing tributary of the Colorado River.

The town bills itself as the "Gateway to the Hill Country," referring to the 25-county region known as the Texas Hill Country.

Climate

The climate in this area is characterized by hot, humid summers and generally mild to cool winters.  According to the Köppen climate classification system, Dripping Springs has a humid subtropical climate, Cfa on climate maps.

Demographics

As of the 2020 United States census, there were 4,650 people, 1,833 households, and 1,278 families residing in the city.

As of the census of 2010, 1,788 people, 662 households, and 455 families resided in the town. The population density was 468.7 people per square mile (181.1/km2). The 723 housing units averaged 176.8 per square mile (68.3/km2). The racial makeup of the town was 81.50% White, 0.90% African American, 1.30% Native American, 0.10% Asian, 16.2% from other races, and 2.0% from two or more races. Hispanics or Latinos of any race were 29.10% of the population.

Of the 662 households, 23.4% had children under the age of 18 living with them, 52.9% were married couples living together, 11.2% had a female householder with no husband present, and 31.3% were not families. About 26.0% of all households were made up of individuals, and 25.5% had someone living alone who was 65 years of age or older. The average household size was 2.69, and the medium family size was 3.23.

In the town, the population was distributed as 30.3% under the age of 19, 5.6% from 18 to 24, 24.9% from 25 to 44, 26.7% from 45 to 64, and 12.6% who were 65 years of age or older. The median age was 37.8 years. For every 100 females, there were 105.3 males. For every 100 females age 18 and over, there were 103.9 males.

The median income for a household in the town was $55,288, and the median income for a family was $61,875. Males had a median income of $51,307 versus $39,798 for females. The per capita income for the town was $28,482. About 5.7% of families and 10.7% of the population were below the poverty line, including 11.4% of those under age 18 and 5.0% of those age 65 or over.

Economy
Dripping Springs is part of the Sustainable Places Project, an initiative to help Dripping Springs and other Central Texas cities create livable places that reflect community goals as the cities grow.

An HEB grocery store and Home Depot are located near the junction of U.S. Highway 290 and RR 12. Dripping Springs is also the wedding capital of Texas and a tourist spot. The town and surrounding area is recognized as a brewery, distillery, and winery destination.

In 2014, Dripping Springs began to attract a new breed of tourists when it was named a Dark Sky Community, the first in Texas. The International Dark-Sky Association made the designation in recognition of the town's 2011 lighting ordinance that reduced outdoor lighting to a minimum. On the last weekend of March, Dripping Springs now hosts annual Dark Sky festivals drawing thousands of Astro-tourists.

Education
The city is served by the Dripping Springs Independent School District. The city has one high school, two middle schools, and five elementary schools. The district was reclassified as 6A in 2022. The area is also served by the Pinnacle Campus of Austin Community College.

Notable people

 Jensen and Danneel Ackles, husband and wife actors
 Phil Cates, former state representative from the Texas Panhandle and lobbyist
 Kyle Chandler, actor (Early Edition, Friday Night Lights, Bloodline)
 Johnny Gimble, fiddle player and songwriter, who played with Bob Wills and His Texas Playboys from the 1940s through 1960s
 John F. Gregory, optical engineer and designer of the Gregory-Maksutov telescope
 E. D. Hill, former host of Fox and Friends
 Jesse James, television personality, motorcycle builder, firearm builder
 Roger A. Keats, member of the Illinois Senate from 1979 to 1992. He moved to Dripping Springs in 2013
 Ben Kweller, musician 
 Pat Mastelotto, Musician
 Adam Narkiewicz, a.k.a. 'Akira the Don', Musician and creator of the Meaningwave genre of Hip-hop
 Israel Nash (Israel Nash Gripka), singer/songwriter
 Kurt Neumann, lead singer and guitarist of BoDeans 
 Dave Pelz, American golf coach and author
 Slim Richey, musician 
 Gregg Rolie, Founding member of the bands Santana and Journey
 Patrick Rose, lawyer, former Democratic state representative, and subject of the documentary Last Man Standing: Politics—Texas Style
 Leonidas Johnson Rountree, newspaper publisher, born here in 1868
 Phillip Sandifer, songwriter, recording artist
 Cameron Duddy, Music video producer and bassist for Midland

References in popular culture
A fictionalized version of Dripping Springs, TX is the home of DC Comics' character Jinny Hex from the superhero team Young Justice.

References

External links

 City of Dripping Springs official website
 Dripping Springs Area Economic Development Committee
 Dripping Springs Community Library
 Dripping Springs Chamber of Commerce
 Dripping Springs Sustainable Cities Project

Cities in Texas
Cities in Hays County, Texas
Cities in Greater Austin